Huang Zhenfei (born 10 February 1999) is a Chinese footballer who currently plays for Shanghai Port.

Club career
Huang joined Chinese Super League side Shanghai SIPG in 2015 and was promoted to the first team squad in 2019. On 23 February 2019, he made his senior debut in a 2–0 win over Beijing Sinobo Guoan in the 2019 Chinese FA Super Cup, coming on as a substitute for Hulk in the injury time. He would be sent to second tier football club Inner Mongolia Zhongyou on 29 July 2020 on loan. For Inner Mongolia Zhongyou he would make his debut for them on 13 September 2020 for Inner Mongolia Zhongyou in a league game against Beijing BSU in a 1-0 defeat.

Career statistics

Club career

Honours

Club
Shanghai SIPG
Chinese FA Super Cup: 2019

References

External links

1999 births
Living people
Chinese footballers
Footballers from Wuhan
Shanghai Port F.C. players
Inner Mongolia Zhongyou F.C. players
Chinese Super League players
China League One players
Association football midfielders
21st-century Chinese people